Energies is a biweekly peer-reviewed open-access scientific journal. It was established in 2008 and is published by MDPI. The editor-in-chief is Enrico Sciubba (Sapienza University of Rome). The journal publishes original papers, review articles, technical notes, and letters to the editor. It concentrates on scientific research, technology, engineering, and management in relation to the field of energy supply, conversion, dispatch, and final usage.

The journal occasionally publishes special issues on specific topics.

Abstracting and indexing
The journal is abstracted and indexed in:

According to the Journal Citation Reports, the journal has a 2020 impact factor of 3.004.

References

External links

Energy and fuel journals
English-language journals
Monthly journals
MDPI academic journals
Open access journals
Publications established in 2008